"Please Help Me, I'm Falling" is a 1960 song written by Don Robertson and Hal Blair and first recorded by Hank Locklin. The single was Locklin's most successful recording and was his second number one on the country charts. "Please Help Me, I'm Falling" spent fourteen weeks at the top spot and spent nine months on the country chart and crossed over to the Hot 100 peaking at number eight.

Chart performance

Answer record
Later in 1960, Skeeter Davis had a hit with an answer record entitled, "(I Can't Help You) I'm Falling Too" which peaked at number two for three weeks on the Hot C&W Sides charts and number thirty-nine on the Hot 100.

Cover versions
During the early 1960s Broadway Record Label released a version of this song on an EP - 45 rpm that featured "Vocals and Orchestra by Popular Artists," none of which are listed anywhere on the record label.

In October 1963, The Everly Brothers recorded the song as one of the tracks on their album The Everly Brothers Sing Great Country Hits, featuring their covers of classic country songs.

On August 1, 1967, Charley Pride covered the song.  His version was not released as a single, and remained unreleased until it was included on his 1997 album The Essential Charley Pride.

In 1973, John Fogerty covered the song on his first solo album, Blue Ridge Rangers.

In 1978, Janie Fricke released a cover version of the song as "Please Help Me (I'm Fallin' in Love with You)" and took it to number 12 on the country charts. Unlike Locklin's piano-based, bright mid-tempo version, Fricke's version is a ballad in the country pop vein.

In 1989, Kirsty MacColl covered the song as b-side to her single "Days".

In 1993, Dolly Parton, Loretta Lynn and Tammy Wynette recorded their version of "Please Help Me (I'm Fallin' in Love with You)" for their album, Honky Tonk Angels, although Loretta herself recording a duet with Conway Twitty from the 1987 Heartland Music album.

In 1996, Puff Johnson recorded a version of "Please Help Me (I'm Fallin' in Love with You)" for her album, Miracle.

Gladys Knight covered the song on her 2001 album "At Last".

In 2007, David Ball covered the song in his album, Heartaches by the Number.

In 2008, Patty Loveless covered the song in her album, Sleepless Nights.

References 

1960 singles
1978 singles
Billboard Hot Country Songs number-one singles of the year
Hank Locklin songs
Homer and Jethro songs
Skeeter Davis songs
Charley Pride songs
John Fogerty songs
Janie Fricke songs
Loretta Lynn songs
Dolly Parton songs
Tammy Wynette songs
David Ball (country singer) songs
Patty Loveless songs
Songs written by Don Robertson (songwriter)
Song recordings produced by Chet Atkins
RCA Victor singles
Columbia Records singles
Songs written by Hal Blair
1960 songs